Costin Caraman (born 20 October 1971) is a Romanian former footballer who played as a striker. His father, Dumitru Caraman was also a footballer.

References

1971 births
Living people
Romanian footballers
Association football forwards
Liga I players
Liga II players
First Professional Football League (Bulgaria) players
FCV Farul Constanța players
FC Brașov (1936) players
FC Olimpia Satu Mare players
FC Astra Giurgiu players
FCM Câmpina players
PFC Dobrudzha Dobrich players
Romanian expatriate footballers
Expatriate footballers in Bulgaria
Expatriate sportspeople in Bulgaria
Romanian expatriates in Bulgaria
Romanian expatriate sportspeople in Bulgaria
Sportspeople from Constanța